Michael Winchester is a Malaysian-born Australian actor, best known for being the third actor to play Marty Jackson in the television series Prisoner, after Ronald Korosy and Andrew McKaige had played the character in earlier episodes.  
 
He had previously appeared in Sons and Daughters as Todd Fisher. Winchester also appeared in Brides of Christ as Martin Tierney. In 1984 he was in the TV-film The Schippan Mystery, and in 1988 the film The Everlasting Secret Family.

Filmography

Film

Television

References

External links
 

Australian male film actors
Australian male soap opera actors
Living people
Year of birth missing (living people)
20th-century Australian male actors
21st-century Australian male actors